"Everyday" is a song written by Dave Loggins and J.D. Martin, and recorded by American country music group The Oak Ridge Boys.  It was released in July 1984 as the first single from their Greatest Hits 2 compilation album.  The song was The Oak Ridge Boys' tenth number one country single.  The single went to number one for one week and spent thirteen weeks on the country chart.

Music video
This music video was filmed at the Tennessee Performing Arts Center in Downtown Nashville in 1984.

Charts

Weekly charts

Year-end charts

References

1984 singles
The Oak Ridge Boys songs
Songs written by Dave Loggins
Songs written by J. D. Martin (songwriter)
Song recordings produced by Ron Chancey
MCA Records singles
1984 songs